"The Cave" is the third single by London rock quartet Mumford & Sons, released from their debut album Sigh No More. It was released in the UK on 26 February 2010. It placed 81 in Triple J Hottest 100, 2009 before the single had been released. It was the second single in the US after "Little Lion Man", and has sold 1,657,000 digital copies there by September 2012. The song is accompanied by a guitar tuned to open D (with a capo on fret 2).

Chart performance
"The Cave" first entered the Australian Singles Chart on 12 February 2010, almost a month before its release. The song peaked at number 31 making it Mumford & Sons' second single to make an impact on the Australian Singles Chart.

On 19 February 2010 "The Cave" debuted at number 43 on the Irish Singles Chart, making it Mumford & Sons' second single to make an impact on the Irish Chart. The following week the single climbed to No. 29, and on 5 March 2010, "The Cave" reached a new peak of No. 20, beating Little Lion Man's peak placement of No. 21. "The Cave" then debuted in the Irish Top 10 on 26 March 2010 at No. 10.

The song was also featured on VH1's top 40 videos of 2011.

"The Cave" first entered the UK Singles Chart on 7 February 2010, at No. 88. The following week, the single climbed eighteen places to No. 70 and then climbed a further 7 to No. 63. The single then climbed to No. 51, and on 7 March 2010, following the physical release of "The Cave", the single climbed to No. 37, making it Mumford & Sons' second Top 40 hit in the UK. The single remained at a fixed position of No. 37 for three weeks. On 28 March 2010, the single climbed five places to No. 32, then reached a peak of No. 31.

As of April 2013, the song had sold 1,778,000 copies in the US.

Use in popular media
In May 2012, the song featured on a Lastminute.com advertisement and on the ITV World Cup 2010 coverage in England. It was also featured prominently in the pilot episode of the Fox Network's drama Lone Star. The song also featured on the first episode of the fourth season of the British TV series Skins.

The song is referenced in the song "All My Lows" by British musician Example with the lyric "Lost in a cave like sons of Mumford".

Award
On 30 November 2011, the song received four nominations in the 54th Annual Grammy Awards including for Record of the Year, Song of the Year, Best Rock Performance and Best Rock Song.

Charts and certifications

Weekly charts

Certifications

Year-end charts

Music video
The official music video for "The Cave" features each of the four band members driving on scooters through the roads of Goa, India while singing the song in tandem with four Indian men in marching band uniforms to whom they gave their instruments at the start of the video.

Release history

References

2010 singles
Mumford & Sons songs
2009 songs
Island Records singles
Songs written by Marcus Mumford
Song recordings produced by Markus Dravs